Belinda Louise Colling (born 12 September 1975) is a former New Zealand international netball and women's basketball representative.

Netball career
As a netballer, Colling represented New Zealand 91 times between 1996 and 2006, playing in the Silver Ferns in three Commonwealth Games and in two Netball World Championships.

In National Bank Cup netball, she played first for the Otago Rebels (1998–2000), before moving to the Canterbury Flames in 2001. She played with the Christchurch-based side until initially retiring in 2005, moving to Scotland with husband Charlie Hore for his rugby career.

She returned to New Zealand and the National Bank Cup in 2006 and played for the seven time-winning Southern Sting. But later that year she announced her retirement for a second time, expecting the birth of her second child.

Basketball career
Colling was a member of the New Zealand women's national basketball team that finished in 11th place at the 2000 Summer Olympics. She is New Zealand Olympian number 774.

Personal life
Colling comes from a sporting background. Her uncle, Lin Colling, was a New Zealand rugby representative. He and several of Belinda's other relatives represented Otago Rugby Football Union at provincial level. Her husband is Charlie Hore, a rugby union player for Otago.

References

1975 births
Living people
New Zealand women's basketball players
New Zealand international netball players
Commonwealth Games gold medallists for New Zealand
Commonwealth Games silver medallists for New Zealand
Olympic basketball players of New Zealand
Basketball players at the 2000 Summer Olympics
People from Cromwell, New Zealand
Commonwealth Games medallists in netball
People educated at Logan Park High School
Netball players at the 1998 Commonwealth Games
Netball players at the 2002 Commonwealth Games
Netball players at the 2006 Commonwealth Games
Team Northumbria netball players
Netball Superleague players
New Zealand expatriate netball people in England
1999 World Netball Championships players
2003 World Netball Championships players
Southern Sting players
Otago Rebels players
Canterbury Flames players
Medallists at the 1998 Commonwealth Games
Medallists at the 2002 Commonwealth Games
Medallists at the 2006 Commonwealth Games